Sidi Mohamed Ben Abdellah University is a university in Fez city, Morocco, which was founded in 1975. It is named for Mohammed ben Abdallah.

See also
 List of universities in Morocco

References

External links
 

 
Universities in Morocco
Buildings and structures in Fez, Morocco
1975 establishments in Morocco
Educational institutions established in 1975
20th-century architecture in Morocco